The Civil Air Patrol's Washington Wing (abbreviated WAWG) is the highest echelon of the Civil Air Patrol in the state of Washington. Its headquarters are located in Pierce County, Washington at McChord Field at Joint Base Lewis–McChord near Tacoma, Washington. Washington Wing oversees 27 primary subordinate squadrons located throughout the state.

Locally, Washington Wing Civil Air Patrol members operate a fleet of 23 vehicles and 14 aircraft (Cessnas
172s, 182s, and a 206, as well as 2 Blanik gliders) for inland search and rescue missions and cadet
orientation flight instruction. Washington members contributed a value of $4.9 million in volunteer hours to
their local communities and the state of Washington in 2016. In April 2018, Washington Wing installed the first female to reach the grade of Colonel, Shelly J. Norman  as Wing Commander in a change of command ceremony in Wenatchee, Washington. 

Other 2016 statistics:
- 144 aircrew personnel
- 515 cadet orientation flights
- 1,537 total hours flown
- 779 emergency responders
- 15 VHF/FM repeaters
- 230 VHF/FM stations
- 41 HF stations

Mission
The Washington Wing performs the three missions of the Civil Air Patrol: providing emergency services; offering cadet programs for youth; and providing aerospace education for both CAP members and the general public.

Emergency services
The Civil Air Patrol provides emergency services, which includes performing search and rescue and disaster relief missions; as well as assisting in humanitarian aid assignments. The CAP also provides Air Force support through conducting light transport, communications support, and low-altitude route surveys. The Civil Air Patrol can also offer support to counter-drug missions.

In March 2021, as a part of Civil Air Patrol's response in combating the COVID-19 pandemic, members of Washington Wing provided support at three vaccine point of distribution.

Cadet programs
The Civil Air Patrol offers a cadet program for youth aged 12 to 21, which includes aerospace education, leadership training, physical fitness and moral leadership.

Aerospace education
The Civil Air Patrol offers aerospace education for CAP members and the general public, including providing training to the members of CAP, and offering workshops for youth throughout the nation through schools and public aviation events.

Squadrons

Northwest Group

Southwest Group

Eastern Group

Legal protection
Under Washington law, it is illegal for an employer within the borders of Washington to discipline or discharge from employment an employee who is a member of the Civil Air Patrol, due to that employee taking a leave of absence in order to take part in an emergency operation as a part of the Civil Air Patrol.

See also
Washington Air National Guard
Washington State Guard
Civil Air Patrol

References

External links 
 Washington Wing Civil Air Patrol
 Senate Resolution Honoring Washington Wing CAP

Wings of the Civil Air Patrol
Military units and formations in Washington (state)